Baruq (also Romanized as Bārūq) is a city in the Central District of Baruq County, West Azerbaijan province, Iran, and serves as capital of the county. At the 2006 census, its population was 3,874 in 913 households, when it was in the former Baruq District of Miandoab County. The following census in 2011 counted 4,118 people in 1,142 households. The latest census in 2016 showed a population of 4,225 people in 1,345 households.

After the census, Baruq District was separated from Miandoab County, elevated to the status of a county, and divided into two districts. The city of Baruq was established in the Central District of the new county and appointed its capital. The city is populated by Azerbaijani Turks.

Etymology 
According to Vladimir Minorsky, the name "Baruq" is derived from the Mongolian word barugh meaning "large, ample".

References 

Cities in West Azerbaijan Province

Populated places in West Azerbaijan Province